Eid Mohammed Al-Farsi (born 8 November 1990), commonly known as Eid Al-Farsi, is an Omani footballer who plays for Al-Seeb in the Oman Professional League.

Club career
On 5 July 2013, he signed a one-year contract with Al-Nahda Club. On 5 July 2014, he moved back to his former club, Al-Oruba SC on a one-year contract.

Wigan trial
After the transfer closes on 2012, English top flight club Wigan Athletic asked Oman Football Association to allow Eid to visit United Kingdom for a trial with Wigan.

Club career statistics

International career
Eid is part of the first team squad of the Oman national football team. He was selected for the national team for the first time in 2010. He made his first appearance for Oman on 20 January 2010 in a friendly match against Sweden. and scored his first international goal on 11 September 2012 in a friendly match against Ireland. He has made appearances in the 2014 FIFA World Cup qualification, the 2013 Gulf Cup of Nations and the 2015 AFC Asian Cup qualification.

National team career statistics

International goals
Scores and results list Oman's goal tally first.

Honours

Al-Oruba
Sultan Qaboos Cup: 2010
Omani Super Cup: 2011

Al-Nahda
Oman Professional League: 2013–14

Al-Seeb
AFC Cup: 2022

Individual
AFC Cup Best Player: 2022

References

External links
 
 
 Eid Al-Farsi at Goal.com
 
 
 Eid Al-Farsi - ASIAN CUP Australia 2015

1987 births
Living people
People from Sur, Oman
Omani footballers
Oman international footballers
Association football midfielders
2015 AFC Asian Cup players
Al-Orouba SC players
Al-Nahda Club (Oman) players
Oman Professional League players
Al-Raed FC players
Saudi Professional League players